King's Men or Kingsmen may refer to:

 King's Men (playing company), an English company of actors to which William Shakespeare belonged

Music
 The King's Men (Choir of King's College), a longstanding close harmony group of young men in Cambridge, England
 The King's Men, an American vocal quartet formed in 1928 by Ken Darby
 The Kingsmen Quartet or The Kingsmen, a Christian music group formed in 1956
 The Kingsmen (Franny Beecher), a 1958 American band formed by Franny Beecher and other moonlighting Comets of Bill Haley and the Comets
 The Kingsmen, an American rock group best known for their 1963 recording of Richard Berry's "Louie Louie"
 The Statler Brothers, previously known as The Kingsmen in the 1960s

Athletics
 Kingsmen, the nickname of the athletic teams at Penn High School, US
 Kingsmen, the nickname of the men's athletic teams at California Lutheran University, US

Other uses
 King's Men (Númenor), Númenórean royalist faction in J. R. R. Tolkien's writings
 Baganda people, an ethnic group of Buganda sometimes known by this exonym
 King's Men (board game), a 1937 board game designed by Elizabeth Magie
 King's Men (TV series), a 1975-80 Australian police drama series

See also
 Maceo & All the King's Men, a jazz act led by Maceo Parker
 Kingman (disambiguation)
 Kingsman (disambiguation), (and King's Man)